Warren Vertress (June 25, 1827 – June 14, 1898) was an American politician.

Vertress was born in Morgan County, Indiana. He lived in Cannon City, Rice County, Minnesota. Vertress served in the Minnesota House of Representatives in 1857 and 1858.

References

1827 births
1898 deaths
People from Morgan County, Indiana
People from Rice County, Minnesota
Members of the Minnesota House of Representatives